Joachim Christian Geelmuyden Gyldenkrantz Frich (24 July 1810 - 29 January 1858) was a Norwegian landscape painter. He was associated with the Düsseldorf school of painting (Düsseldorf-skolen).

Biography
Joachim Frich was from Bergen, Norway. He was the son of  David Frich (1782-1859) and his wife Gertrude Barclay (1782-1838).
He received his first training in Bergen with  Lyder Sagen   and Carl Peter Lehmann (1794-1876).  He studied at the Art Academy in Copenhagen under Christoffer Wilhelm Eckersberg, Johan Ludwig Lund and Johan Frederik Møller  from 1834 to 1836.   He advanced  to  Gipsskolen, where he was a student from  1834 until 1835. He then went to the Dresden Art Academy of Art (Kunstakademie Düsseldorf) in 1836, where he was a pupil of Johan Christian Dahl from 1836 to 1837. From 1837-1839, he stayed in Munich, where he was influences by the landscape paintings  of Carl Rottmann.

He then settled in Christiania (now Oslo) and in 1841 he became a teacher of the Royal School of Drawing. He also became a member of the board of the National Gallery in Christiania. In 1844 Frich was one of the founders of the Society for the Preservation of Ancient Norwegian Monuments (Foreningen til Norske Fortidsmindesmerkers Bevaring). In 1846 and 1855 he undertook study trips to Düsseldorf, whose school of painting influenced him artistically. He also undertook annual trips,  visiting  Sweden, the Netherlands and Belgium.

In 1850, he completed a series of six large decorative landscape paintings for the dining room in Oscarshall palace on Bygdøy. He also completed illustrations for Norge fremstillet i tegninger,  a series of books produced by Norwegian publisher and author,  Christian Tønsberg.

Gallery

References

Other sources
 Noss, Aagot (1973) Joachim Frichs draktakvarellar (Det Norske Samlaget)

External links
Joachim Frich gallery

1810 births
1858 deaths
Artists from Bergen
Norwegian landscape painters
Norwegian expatriates in Germany
19th-century Norwegian painters
Norwegian male painters
19th-century Norwegian male artists